Silang Mabele is Vusi Mahlasela's third album.

Track listing
 "Khunkhwane"
 "Silang Mabele"
 "Loneliness"
 "Sleep Tight Margaret"
 "Antone"
 "Kwa-Zulu"
 "Troubador"
 "Africa is Dying"
 "Smomothela"
 "Love Prints"
 "Ke Kgale"
 "Kuyobanjani Na?"
 "Voices"
 "Weeping"

Vusi Mahlasela albums
1997 albums